The Imiut fetish (jmy-wt) is a religious object that has been documented throughout the history of ancient Egypt. It was a stuffed, headless animal skin, often of a feline or bull. This fetish was tied by the tail to a pole, terminating in a lotus bud and inserted into a stand. The item was present in ancient Egyptian funerary rites from at least the earliest dynasties. Although its origin and purpose is unknown, the imiut fetish dates as far back as the First Dynasty (3100–2890 BC).

History
The earliest known depiction of the jmy-wt fetish is on a Predynastic lug handle dating to Naqada IIc-d, which appears to show the procedure by which intestines were extracted from a sacrificial bird and tied to the fetish. In the First Dynasty, the fetish appears on seals and labels during the reigns of kings Hor-Aha, Djer, Djet, and Den, where the jmy-wt is associated with ritual killings of prisoners. Another example found in 1914 by an expedition of the Metropolitan Museum of Art near the pyramid of Senusret I (c. 1971-1928 BCE) was placed in a shrine.

There are depictions of the imiut fetish on ancient Egyptian temples, and sometimes there were models of it included with the funerary equipment, most notably the two found in the burial chamber of Tutankhamun by Howard Carter. The fetish was later connected to the god Anubis and mummification around the Fourth Dynasty, so it is sometimes called the Anubis fetish.

Meaning 
Logan suggests that the jmy.wt has its origin as a standard associated with kingship and transition, a pole upon which the intestines of a ritual animal sacrifice were hung. This he connects to an etymology jmy.wt "that which is inside", analogous to jmyw "tumor". In this scenario, the name was later reanalyzed as a reference to embalming after the association with Anubis.

Notes

4th-millennium BC establishments
Egyptian artefact types
Ancient Egyptian symbols
Gerzeh culture
Anubis